The XVIII 2013 Pan Am Badminton Championships were held in Santo Domingo, Dominican Republic, between October 24 and October 27, 2013.

This event was part of the 2013 BWF Grand Prix Gold and Grand Prix series of the Badminton World Federation.

Venue
Palacio de los Deportes Virgilio Travieso Soto, Santo Domingo

Medalists

References

External links
Official website
TournamentSoftware.com: Individual Results
TournamentSoftware.com: Team Results

Pan Am Badminton Championships
Pan Am Badminton Championships
Pan Am Badminton Championships
Badminton tournaments in the Dominican Republic
Sport in Santo Domingo